Alexandru Dimca is a Romanian mathematician, who works in algebraic geometry at University of Nice Sophia Antipolis.

Education and career 
Dimca competed in the International Mathematical Olympiad in 1970, 1971, and 1972, earning two bronze medals and one silver medal.
He obtained his PhD in 1981 from the University of Bucharest; his thesis "Stable mappings and singularities", was written under the direction of Gheorghe Galbură. His Google Scholar h-index is 24.

Dimca is a distinguished mathematician in algebra, geometry and topology. He has written three important books in this field: Sheaves in Topology, Singularities and Topology of Hypersurfaces and Topics on real and complex singularities.

Honors 

He received a Doctor Honoris Causa of Ovidius University.

Books

Main articles 

 Pierre Deligne, Alexandru Dimca, Filtrations de Hodge et par l'ordre du pôle pour les hypersurfaces singulières, 1990.

References

External links 

 Google Scholar
 Personal website

Algebraic geometers
Living people
21st-century Romanian mathematicians
Year of birth missing (living people)
20th-century Romanian mathematicians